The Book Cliff Mines were coal mines located near Grand Junction, Colorado, United States.  They closed in 1925.

History and description

By the time Grand Junction was three years old, it had become apparent to its citizens that they needed a good coal supply if the town were to grow and prosper. Early in 1884 an experienced coal miner named George W. Smith set out to locate a mine that would adequately supply the city's needs. In a remote and unexplored canyon of the Book Cliffs twelve miles from town he found a huge body of coal. Smith and several other men developed the discovery into what became known as the Book Cliff Mine. Two years later another coal mine was opened a half a mile north of the Book Cliff coal mine; it was called the Grand Valley Mine. Both mines were purchased by William Thomas Carpenter in the summer of 1888, and under his Grand Valley Fuel Company they were improved and further developed. He built the Little Book Cliff Railway to serve the mines. A small community of miners took root nearby. The U.S. post office established a branch there during June 1890, officially dubbing the settlement Carpenter, Colorado.

One of Carpenter's first improvements was the installation of a gravity powered tramway (known as a funicular) at each of the mines. Cars traveled the  incline between the mine adit and coal tipple on three rail tracks (except at the passing point, where four rails were used). The mechanics of the trams were simple; one end of a wire rope was attached to the car at the mine and the other end to the car at the tipple. Between the two cars the rope was wound around a drum and brake mechanism located above the mine adit. The weight of the loaded car traveling down was thus used to return an empty car from the tipple to the mine.

When Isaac Chauncy Wyman acquired the Book Cliff company in January 1899, he installed his nephew William Stanley Phillips as manager. Phillips proved to be as concerned and capable a lieutenant as Wyman could have hoped for.

Following the turn of the century the mines developed serious problems. The Grand Valley Mine was running out of coal and in the Book Cliff Mine the slope of the vein had become so steep that it was rapidly becoming impractical to work the mine. Phillips began a new mine, south of the Book Cliff Mine in Coal Mesa, which he hoped would produce a mine with unlimited potential. The prospect mine failed and the only choice he had was to tunnel through  of sandstone (beneath the original Book Cliff Mine) into the vein at a lower, workable level. This was finally accomplished in 1905 and is today the mine that has "Carpenter" cut into the stone over the adit. Production resumed and all went well until Phillips died in late 1915. Princeton University then managed the mine in absentia but the life had gone out of the company and it began deteriorating slowly.

Early in July 1923 the mine caught fire. Princeton was forced to spend large sums of money in unsuccessful attempts to extinguish the fire. With coal usage falling off in favor of natural gas, and paved highways for motor trucks creating competition from local farmer mines, Princeton decided that it wanted out of the coal business. The decision was made to abandon the mine, town, and railroad in 1925.

Three Grand Junction teenagers suffocated to death while exploring the Book Cliff Mine on August 13, 1989. Following the incident the mine adit was permanently sealed.

References
Lampert, Lyndon J.; Robert W. McLeod. Little Book Cliff Railway: The Life and Times of a Colorado Narrow Gauge. Boulder CO: Pruett Publishing Co., 1984.

External links

Coal mines in the United States
Buildings and structures in Mesa County, Colorado
Underground mines in the United States
Mines in Colorado